Chloe Butler (born 11 April 1987) is a female rugby union player and former gridiron football player.

Early life
Butler grew up on a cattle property in Croydon, Queensland, Australia. Butler moved to Canberra, was a Canberra Raiders cheerleader, and started out in running and gymnastics before getting injured.

Playing career

Rugby union career
Butler formerly played for the Australian Capital Territory, Parramatta Two Blues and currently for the Wallaroos. She has been selected in the Wallaroos squad to the 2014 Women's Rugby World Cup. Butler was part of the first ever women's Bledisloe Cup double header before the All Blacks vs the Wallabies in 2016. Butler played No.5.
Butler played Openside flanker against England and Canada and no.6 against the Black Ferns in the Womens Four Nations tour in New Zealand in June 2017.
Butler played in the 2017 Womens Rugby World Cup in Ireland for Australia. She played lock and open side flanker.   Butler has 14 caps for Australia.  In October 2017 Butler moved to England to play for south west London club Richmond FC in the Tyrrrell's Womens Rugby Championship. She made her debut, as a No. 8, on October 21st at the Athletic Ground in a defeat versus Saracens.http://richmondfc.co.uk/index.php/news/808-rihmond-women-v-saracens. She now plays for Harlequins.

WRWC 2017 statistics

American football / gridiron career
Butler is a former wide receiver and defensive end for the Los Angeles Temptation and captained the New South Wales Surge, Western Conference squad for the 2012 LFL All-Fantasy Game Tour.

LFL statistics

Personal life
Butler dated Penrith Panthers and South Sydney Rabbitohs player Tim Grant.

Butler currently plays rugby union in the Tyrrell’s Premier 15s league for Harlequins and resides in London, England with three fellow rugby playing housemates. 

Outside of rugby she enjoys running, socialising with friends, red wine and dark chocolate digestives.

References

External links
Wallaroos Profile

1987 births
Living people
Australian female models
Legends Football League players
Australian cheerleaders
Australian female rugby union players
Australia women's international rugby union players
Rugby union flankers
Rugby union locks
Australian players of American football